Year 962 (CMLXII) was a common year starting on Wednesday (link will display the full calendar) of the Julian calendar.

Events 
 By place 

 Byzantine Empire 
 December – Arab–Byzantine wars – Sack of Aleppo: A Byzantine expeditionary force under General Nikephoros Phokas invades northern Syria, and sacks Aleppo, capital of the Hamdanid emir Sayf al-Dawla. In late December Aleppo is taken by storm, with the population killed or enslaved; the city is razed. The Byzantine army takes possession of 390,000 silver dinars, 2,000 camels and 1,400 mules.

 Europe 
 February 2 – King Otto I (the Great) is crowned Holy Roman Emperor by Pope John XII at the Old St. Peter's Basilica, ending Rome's feudal anarchy. Otto's wife Adelaide is anointed as empress; the East Frankish Kingdom and the Kingdom of Italy are unified into a common realm, called the Roman Empire.
 February 13 – Otto I and John XII co-sign the Diploma Ottonianum, confirming John XII as the spiritual head of the Catholic Church. Otto recognizes John XII's secular control over the Papal States – by expanding the domain over the Exarchate of Ravenna, the Duchy of Spoleto, and the Duchy of Benevento. 
 Summer – Otto I makes Oberto I, a margrave of the Obertenghi family, count palatine (a position second only to his own). He is granted the March of Obertenga (Eastern Liguria) and establishes his capital in Genoa. Oberto also receives the possessions of the Abbey of Bobbio (famous for its scriptorium).
 Otto I takes his army to lay siege at San Giulio, an island within Lake Orta (Piedmont), where Queen Willa (the wife of King Berengar II) has barricaded herself. She surrenders and is allowed to go free by Otto. Willa departs for Montefeltro to join her husband.
 Otto I proceeds to lay siege to Lake Garda, where the sons of Berengar II, Guy of Ivrea and Adalbert II (co-ruler of Italy), and their supporters are holed up. Finding severe resistance, Otto gives up the enterprise and returns to Pavia, the capital of Lombardy. 
 Fall – Otto I receives news that John XII has betrayed him and entered into intrigues with Berengar II, but also with the Byzantine Empire. The letters are intercepted by Pandulf I (Ironhead), Lombard prince of Benevento.

 England 
 Indulf, king of the Scots and Picts, dies after an 8-year reign. He is killed while fighting Vikings near Cullen, at the Battle of Bauds. Indulf is succeeded by his nephew Dub (Dub mac Maíl Coluim) as ruler of Scotland.

 By topic 

 Religion 
 St. Paul's Cathedral in London is destroyed by fire, but rebuilt in the same year.

Births 
 Bernard Roger, French nobleman (approximate date)
 Edward II (the Martyr), king of England (approximate date)
 Geoffrey (or Godfrey), French nobleman (d. 1015)
 Ibn Faradi, Moorish scholar and historian (d. 1012)
 Liu Mei, Chinese official and general (approximate date)
 Odilo of Cluny, French Benedictine abbot (d. 1049)
 Rogneda of Polotsk, Grand Princess of Kiev (d. 1002)
 Wang Qinruo, Chinese chancellor (approximate date)
 William of Volpiano, Italian abbot and architect (d. 1031)

Deaths 
 April 26 – Adalbero I, bishop of Metz
 May 23 – Guibert, Frankish abbot (b. 892)
 October 14 – Gerloc, Frankish noblewoman
 Æthelwald, ealdorman of East Anglia
 Baldwin III (the Young), Frankish nobleman
 Charles Constantine, Frankish nobleman
 Dong Yuan, Chinese painter (approximate date)
 Gao Baoxu, king of Nanping (China) (b. 924)
 Gauzelin, Frankish nobleman and bishop
 Hamza al-Isfahani, Persian historian (approximate date)
 Hugh of Vermandois, Frankish archbishop (b. 920)
 Ibn az-Zayyat, Hamdanid governor
 Indulf (the Aggressor), king of Scotland
 Liu Congxiao, Chinese general (b. 906)
 Ordoño IV, king of León (or 963)
 Sigurd Haakonsson, Norse Viking nobleman 
 William Taillefer I, Frankish nobleman

References